Epitonium bucknilli is a species of small predatory or ectoparasitic sea snail, a marine gastropod mollusc in the family Epitoniidae, the wentletraps.

Distribution
This species is known only from shallow water in northeastern New Zealand.

References

 Powell A W B, New Zealand Mollusca, William Collins Publishers Ltd, Auckland, New Zealand 1979 

Epitoniidae
Gastropods of New Zealand
Gastropods described in 1924